American Family may refer to:

American Family (artwork exhibition), by Renée Cox
 American Family (2002 TV series), a PBS drama starring Edward James Olmos and Constance Marie
 An American Family, a 1973 documentary broadcast on PBS
 "An American Family" (song), by The Oak Ridge Boys
 "An American Family" (Brothers & Sisters episode)
 "An American Family", an episode of Cheers
 The Beach Boys: An American Family, a television biopic of the Beach Boys

See also
 American family structure